The 1973 USC Trojans baseball team represented the University of Southern California in the 1973 NCAA University Division baseball season. The team was coached Rod Dedeaux in his 32nd season.

The Trojans won the College World Series, defeating the Arizona State Sun Devils in the championship game, winning their fourth of five consecutive national championships, and the fifth in six years.

Roster

Schedule

! style="background:#FFCC00;color:#990000;"| Regular Season
|- 

|- align="center" bgcolor="ddffdd"
| February 17 ||  || 6–1 || 1–0 || –
|- align="center" bgcolor="ddffdd"
| February 17 || San Diego State || 5–3 || 2–0 || –
|- align="center" bgcolor="#ddffdd"
| February 20 || at  || 3–1 || 3–0 || –
|- align="center" bgcolor="ddffdd"
| February 23 ||  || 5–2 || 4–0 || –
|- align="center" bgcolor="#ddffdd"
| February 24 ||  || 5–4 || 5–0 || –
|- align="center" bgcolor="#ddffdd"
| February 24 || UC Santa Barbara || 10–6 || 6–0 || –
|-

|- align="center" bgcolor="ddffdd"
| March 2 || at  || 5–0 || 7–0 || –
|- align="center" bgcolor="ddffdd"
| March 3 || at Fresno State || 6–2 || 8–0 || –
|- align="center" bgcolor="ddffdd"
| March 3 || at Fresno State || 2–0 || 9–0 || –
|- align="center" bgcolor="ddffdd"
| March 7 ||  || 10–2 || 10–0 || –
|- align="center" bgcolor="#ddffdd"
| March 10 ||  || 6–3 || 11–0 || 1–0
|- align="center" bgcolor="#ddffdd"
| March 10 || UCLA || 10–1 || 12–0 || 2–0
|- align="center" bgcolor="ffdddd"
| March 15 || at Arizona State || 2–4 || 12–1 || –
|- align="center" bgcolor="ffdddd"
| March 16 || at Arizona State || 4–8 || 12–2 || –
|- align="center" bgcolor="ffdddd"
| March 17 || at Arizona State || 5–12 || 12–3 || –
|- align="center" bgcolor="ddffdd"
| March 21 ||  || 13–12 || 13–3 || –
|- align="center" bgcolor="ddffdd"
| March 23 ||  || 2–1 || 14–3 || –
|- align="center" bgcolor="ddffdd"
| March 26 || vs. Arizona State || 3–1 || 15–3 || –
|- align="center" bgcolor="ddffdd"
| March 27 || vs.  || 4–0 || 16–3 || –
|- align="center" bgcolor="ffdddd"
| March 27 || vs.  || 4–5 || 16–4 || –
|- align="center" bgcolor="ddffdd"
| March 29 || vs.  || 9–2 || 17–4 || –
|- align="center" bgcolor="ddffdd"
| March 30 || vs.  || 16–4 || 18–4 || –
|- align="center" bgcolor="#ddffdd"
| March 30 || at  || 7–4 || 19–4 || –
|- align="center" bgcolor="ddffdd"
| March 31 || vs.  || 8–2 || 20–4 || –
|- align="center" bgcolor="ddffdd"
| March 31 || vs. Arizona State || 2–0 || 21–4 || –
|-

|- align="center" bgcolor="ddffdd"
| April 1 || at  || 9–2 || 22–4 || –
|- align="center" bgcolor="ffdddd"
| April 3 || at  || 3–15 || 22–5 || –
|- align="center" bgcolor="ddffdd"
| April 6 ||  || 14–0 || 23–5 || 3–0
|- align="center" bgcolor="ddffdd"
| April 7 || California || 2–1 || 24–5 || 4–0
|- align="center" bgcolor="ddffdd"
| April 7 || California || 8–4 || 25–5 || 5–0
|- align="center" bgcolor="ddffdd"
| April 9 ||  || 14–4 || 26–5 || –
|- align="center" bgcolor="ffdddd"
| April 10 || UC Irvine || 0–5 || 26–6 || –
|- align="center" bgcolor="ddffdd"
| April 11 ||  || 14–3 || 27–6 || –
|- align="center" bgcolor="ddffdd"
| April 13 || at Stanford || 2–1 || 28–6 || 6–0
|- align="center" bgcolor="ffdddd"
| April 14 || at Stanford || 0–1 || 28–7 || 6–1
|- align="center" bgcolor="ddffdd"
| April 14 || at Stanford || 3–0 || 29–7 || 7–1
|- align="center" bgcolor="ddffdd"
| April 17 || at Hawaii || 10–6 || 30–7 || –
|- align="center" bgcolor="ddffdd"
| April 24 || at Cal State Los Angeles || 9–4 || 31–7 || –
|- align="center" bgcolor="ffdddd"
| April 25 || at Chapman || 5–6 || 31–8 || –
|- align="center" bgcolor="ddffdd"
| April 27 || Stanford || 12–8 || 32–8 || 8–1
|- align="center" bgcolor="ddffdd"
| April 28 || Stanford || 1–0 || 33–8 || 9–1
|- align="center" bgcolor="ffdddd"
| April 28 || Stanford || 0–3 || 33–9 || 9–2
|-

|- align="center" bgcolor="ddffdd"
| May 1 || at Cal Poly Pomona || 18–13 || 34–9 || –
|- align="center" bgcolor="ffdddd"
| May 4 || at California || 4–5 || 34–10 || 9–3
|- align="center" bgcolor="ddffdd"
| May 5 || at California || 8–2 || 35–10 || 10–3
|- align="center" bgcolor="ddffdd"
| May 5 || at California || 2–0 || 36–10 || 11–3
|- align="center" bgcolor="ddffdd"
| May 8 ||  || 10–3 || 37–10 || –
|- align="center" bgcolor="ffdddd"
| May 10 || at UCLA || 5–6 || 37–11 || 11–4
|- align="center" bgcolor="ddffdd"
| May 11 || UCLA || 6–2 || 38–11 || 12–4
|- align="center" bgcolor="ddffdd"
| May 12 || at UCLA || 8–4 || 39–11 || 13–4
|- align="center" bgcolor="ddffdd"
| May 12 || at UCLA || 6–4 || 40–11 || 14–4
|-

|-
! style="background:#FFCC00;color:#990000;"| Post–Season
|-
|-

|- align="center" bgcolor="ddffdd"
| May 18 || vs. Washington State || Buck Bailey Field || 13–4 || 41–11
|- align="center" bgcolor="ddffdd"
| May 19 || vs. Washington State || Buck Bailey Field || 11–9 || 42–11
|-

|- align="center" bgcolor="ddffdd"
| May 26 || vs. Loyola Marymount || Bovard Field || 9–8 || 43–11
|- align="center" bgcolor="ddffdd"
| May 27 || vs. Loyola Marymount || Bovard Field || 2–1 || 44–11
|- align="center" bgcolor="ddffdd"
| June 1 || vs. Cal State Los Angeles || Bovard Field || 4–3 || 45–11
|- align="center" bgcolor="ddffdd"
| June 2 || vs. Cal State Los Angeles || Bovard Field || 13–6 || 46–11
|-

|- align="center" bgcolor="ddffdd"
| June 9 || vs.  || Rosenblatt Stadium || 4–1 || 47–11
|- align="center" bgcolor="ddffdd"
| June 10 || vs. Texas || Rosenblatt Stadium || 4–1 || 48–11
|- align="center" bgcolor="ddffdd"
| June 11 || vs. Arizona State || Rosenblatt Stadium || 3–1 || 49–11
|- align="center" bgcolor="ddffdd"
| June 12 || vs. Minnesota || Rosenblatt Stadium || 8–7 || 50–11
|- align="center" bgcolor="ddffdd"
| June 13 || vs. Arizona State || Rosenblatt Stadium || 4–3 || 51–11
|-

Awards and honors 
Rich Dauer
All-Pacific-8 First Team

Ken Huizenga
College World Series All-Tournament Team

Ed Putnam
All-Pacific-8 First Team

Randy Scarbery
College World Series All-Tournament Team
All-America First Team
All-Pacific-8 First Team

Roy Smalley
College World Series All-Tournament Team 
All-America First Team
All-Pacific-8 First Team

Trojans in the 1973 MLB Draft
The following members of the USC baseball program were drafted in the 1973 Major League Baseball Draft.

June regular draft

June secondary draft

References

USC
USC Trojans baseball seasons
Pac-12 Conference baseball champion seasons
College World Series seasons
NCAA Division I Baseball Championship seasons
USC Trojans